Ellipsoptera nevadica, the Nevada tiger beetle, is a species of flashy tiger beetle in the family Carabidae. It is found in Central America and North America.

Subspecies
These nine subspecies belong to the species Ellipsoptera nevadica:
 Ellipsoptera nevadica citata (Rumpp, 1977)
 Ellipsoptera nevadica knausi
 Ellipsoptera nevadica knausii (Leng, 1902)
 Ellipsoptera nevadica lincolniana (Casey, 1916) (salt creek tiger beetle)
 Ellipsoptera nevadica makosika (Spomer, 2004)
 Ellipsoptera nevadica metallica (Sumlin, 1990)
 Ellipsoptera nevadica nevadica (LeConte, 1875)
 Ellipsoptera nevadica olmosa (Vaurie, 1951)
 Ellipsoptera nevadica tubensis (Cazier, 1939)

References

Further reading

 

Cicindelidae
Articles created by Qbugbot
Beetles described in 1875